Results from Norwegian football in 1947.

Norwegian Cup

Final

Northern Norwegian Cup

Final

National team

References

      
Seasons in Norwegian football